Palnati Pourusham is a 1994 Indian Telugu-language film directed by Muthyala Subbaiah starring Krishnam Raju, Radhika and Charan Raj. It is a remake of the 1993 Tamil film Kizhakku Cheemayile. The film was released on 29 July 1994.

Plot 
A brother and sister share a close bond with each other. When the sister gets married, her husband dislikes the bond, due to which problems arise between the couple.

Cast

Music 
The soundtrack features songs composed by A. R. Rahman with lyrics by debutant Sivaganesh, D. Narayanavarma, Vennelakanti, and Jaladi. All of the songs were reused from the original film, Kizhakku Cheemayile.

References

External links 
 

1990s Telugu-language films
1994 films
Films directed by Muthyala Subbaiah
Films scored by A. R. Rahman
Telugu remakes of Tamil films